Polymorphomyia is a genus of tephritid or fruit flies in the family Tephritidae.

Species
Polymorphomyia basilica Snow, 1894
Polymorphomyia footei Korytkowski, 1971
Polymorphomyia pilosula Wulp, 1899
Polymorphomyia striola (Fabricius, 1805)
Polymorphomyia tridentata (Hendel, 1914)

References

Tephritinae
Tephritidae genera
Diptera of North America
Diptera of South America